Miss & Mister Deaf World (MMDW) is an international beauty pageant which crowns young deaf women "Miss Deaf World" and young deaf men "Mister Deaf World" every year, usually in Prague, in the Czech Republic.

History 
MMDW is a Nonprofit organization which was created in 2001. The pageant is organised by the companies MISS DEAF s.r.o. and MISS – MISTER DEAF s.r.o., and their president is Josef Uhlíř. The official language in the contest is International Sign Language, and the crystal crowns for all the finalists are made by Astera s.r.o.

By the rules of the contest, a winner is disallowed to participate in another beauty contest. On July 9, 2010, there was a MDW contest in Tbilisi, Georgia, and Miss Julie Abbou from France contested. She won three titles of the first Vicemiss Deaf World 2010, the second Vicemiss Deaf World 2010 and of the Miss Sympathy Deaf World 2010. Afterwards, Abbou contested Miss Deaf International in Las Vegas, Nevada on July 31, 2010, and was crowned as Miss Deaf International. As a result, Uhlíř published an announcement at MDW website about disqualifying Abbou from the titles of 1st Vicemiss Deaf World 2010 and of Miss Sympathy Deaf World 2010, which Abbou won during the final ceremony of Miss Deaf World 2010 and Miss Deaf Europe 2010 competitions in Tbilisi. Uhlíř stated that during the MDW competitions, Abbou was personally informed, as well as the other competing girls, that in the case of receiving one of the official titles of the MDW competitions, the winner would be prohibited from participation in any other Miss competition. Uhlíř explained the reason for keeping the high status of the both competitions, keeping the high reputation of the gained titles and preventing any hurt of Miss Deaf World and Miss Deaf Europe competitions prestige. Uhlíř added that every girl could participate these competitions, even two times, if she was not awarded any of the titles during her first participation. He wrote that with validity from August 1, 2010, the title of first Vicemiss Deaf World 2010, which was taken from Abbou, went to Zhihuang Wang from China, and her title of second Vicemiss Deaf World 2010 went to Stella Falawo Kunjan from Ghana, which took originally the fourth place. The title of Miss Sympathy Deaf World 2010, which also was taken from Abbou by Uhlíř, would be won by Portia Oliver from South Africa, which took originally the second place in this category.

In 2018, Assia Uhanany from Israel won Miss Deaf World. Xu Jinghui, a contestant from Taiwan, took a photo with her, and wrote her impression of the contest. She told about the foreign environment in Prague, wishing to contact foreign Deaf friends from different countries, hopefully communicating with them. She wrote her daily activity: The second day was a free day, and they visited close attractions, starting to make Deaf friends by chatting each other with the international sign language. The third day to the sixth day were in the class, for practicing the show together, and sharing international sign language and Deaf culture among different countries. The show started on September 29, 2018, left her a little sad and discouraged, but it was a rare experience for her. She was happy to be able to go abroad and acquire a lot of foreign friends, and thanked the China Association of the Deaf for giving her such a chance to go abroad, and for teaching her international sign language as well.

On April 16, 2019, Uhlíř wrote sorrowfully about the passing away of Engineer Vladimír Žíla, a General partner of the world competitions, Miss & Mister Deaf World and Europe and Asia, and the Director of Astera glass.

On May 25, 2019, Miss Deaf World 2017 and Mister Deaf Europe 2018 got married in Croatia.

Titleholders

See also 
 List of beauty pageants

References

External links 
 

Beauty pageants
Deaf culture
International beauty pageants
Male beauty pageants
Continental beauty pageants